Videogaming Illustrated, also known as VGI, was a video game magazine published in the United States and ran from August 1982 to March 1984.

History
VGI changed its title twice: in issue June 1983 to Videogaming and Computer Gaming Illustrated and in issue January 1984 to Video and Computer Gaming Illustrated. It began life as a bi-monthly publication before becoming a monthly publication. Its short run has been explained by the video game crash of 1983.

Content
The magazine was split up into the following sections:
 Keyboard
 Eye On
 Preview
 VIP
 Focus On
 Input
 RAMblings

The Star Words section featured commentary about computer games from celebrities such as Charlton Heston and Kirk Douglas.

See also
 List of video game magazines

References

External links
ataricompendium.com - PDF magazine repository
digitpress.com - PDF magazine repository
retromags.com - PDF magazine repository (in high resolution)
Videogaming Illustrated magazines on the Internet Archive 

1982 establishments in Connecticut
1984 disestablishments in Connecticut
Bimonthly magazines published in the United States
Monthly magazines published in the United States
Video game magazines published in the United States
Defunct computer magazines published in the United States
Magazines established in 1982
Magazines disestablished in 1984
Magazines published in Connecticut